Chloe MacCombe (born 24 May 1995) is a Northern Irish paratriathlete.

Chloe is one of a pair of twins, along with Judith MacCombe, with visual impairment due to albinism; both compete as paratriathletes.

Chloe won a silver medal at the 2022 Commonwealth Games in the women's paratriathlon, with Catherine A. Sands as her sighted guide.

References

1995 births
Living people
Irish female triathletes
21st-century Irish women
Sportspeople from County Londonderry
Triathletes at the 2022 Commonwealth Games
Triathletes from Northern Ireland
Commonwealth Games medallists in triathlon
Commonwealth Games silver medallists for Northern Ireland
Paratriathletes
Competitors in athletics with a visual impairment
People with albinism
Twins from Northern Ireland
Twin sportspeople
Medallists at the 2022 Commonwealth Games